Prince George North was a provincial electoral district for the Legislative Assembly of British Columbia, Canada from 1979 to 2009.

Demographics

Geography

History 
John Heinrich, Social Credit (1979–1986)
Lois Boone, NDP (1986–1991)
Paul Ramsey, NDP (1991–2001)
Pat Bell, Liberal (2001–2009)

Member of Legislative Assembly 

Its Member of the Legislative Assembly (MLA) is the Hon. Pat Bell, former owner of a trucking company and co-owner of a logging company. He owns two Wendy's Restaurants in Prince George. He was first elected in 2001. He represents the British Columbia Liberal Party. Mr. Bell was appointed Minister of State for Mining on January 26, 2004, and on June 16, 2005, after the 2005 election, was appointed the Minister of Agriculture and Lands.

Election results 

|-

|-

|}

|-
 
|NDP
|Paul Ramsey
|align="right"|5,837
|align="right"|39.58%
|align="right"|
|align="right"|$32,817

|-

|Independent
|Ken Benham
|align="right"|495
|align="right"|3.36%
|align="right"|
|align="right"|$868

|}

|-

|-

}
|Western Reform
|Lisa Maskell
|align="right"|621
|align="right"|4.11%
|align="right"|
|align="right"|$8,195

|Independent
|Fred McLeod
|align="right"|478
|align="right"|3.17%
|align="right"|
|align="right"|$854

|Independent
|Leif Jensen
|align="right"|76
|align="right"|0.51%
|align="right"|
|align="right"|$100

|}

External links 
BC Stats Profile - 2001 (pdf)
Results of 2001 election (pdf)
2001 Expenditures
Results of 1996 election
1996 Expenditures
Results of 1991 election
1991 Expenditures
Website of the Legislative Assembly of British Columbia

Former provincial electoral districts of British Columbia
Politics of Prince George, British Columbia